William Marshall Wright (July 14, 1926 – December 31, 2013) was United States Assistant Secretary of State for Legislative Affairs from May 29, 1973, until February 2, 1974.  He had previously been senior staff member at the National Security Council. He was a resident of Arkansas.

References

List of Assistant Secretaries
Nixon archives
State Department history

United States Assistant Secretaries of State
1926 births
Place of birth missing
2013 deaths
United States National Security Council staffers